The Church of Jesus Christ of Latter-day Saints in Tennessee refers to the Church of Jesus Christ of Latter-day Saints (LDS Church) and its members in Tennessee. The first branch in Tennessee was organized in 1834. It has since grown to 55,456 members in 112 congregations.

Official church membership as a percentage of general population was 0.75% in 2014. According to the 2014 Pew Forum on Religion & Public Life survey, roughly 1% of Tennesseans self-identified most closely with The Church of Jesus Christ of Latter-day Saints. The LDS Church is the 10th largest denomination in Tennessee.

History

David W. Patten and Warren Parish arrived in Tennessee shortly before 11 October 1834 and soon baptized 31 people: organizing a branch by the end of the year.  These efforts were in Henry, Benton, and Humphreys counties. In 1835, Parrish worked alone after Patten returned to Kirtland, Ohio.

On March 27, 1835, Wilford Woodruff, then a priest, came to assist Parrish.  When Warren Parrish was called as a Seventy in July 1835, he ordained Woodruff as an elder and placed him in charge of the work in Tennessee. Woodruff was assisted by Abraham O. Smoot and Benjamin L. Clapp.

In 1836, there were about 100 members in seven branches.  By 1839, 12 branches existed in the state and by 1846, missionaries had preached in 26 counties.  Following the exodus to the West, little work was done in Tennessee.  Hyrum H. Blackwell and Emmanuel M. Murphy visited the state in 1857 to call the saints to gather in the west.

In 1870, Hayden Church resumed work in Tennessee.  The Southern States Mission was formally organized in 1875 with headquarters in Nashville, then moved to Chattanooga in 1882 and remained there until 1919, when Atlanta, Georgia became mission headquarters.

Henry G. Boyle established a branch at Shady Grove in 1875.  Mob activity increased significantly in 1879.  Some converts in the South left their homes and migrated to the west in 1883.

In 1884, members were fired upon in separate incidents.  Elder James Rosskelley was shot in eastern Tennessee on August 8, 1884. Elder Rosskelley would survive and his attacker was captured and bound over for trial. The worst massacre of Church members in the South, however, occurred on August 10, 1884, when a mob shot to death missionaries William S. Berry and John H. Gibbs and local members W. Martin Conder and John Riley Hutson during LDS Church services at the home of W. James Conder on Cane Creek in Lewis County. Sister Malinda Conder was injured as well in the attack but recovered enough to walk with a cane. Mission President Brigham H. Roberts donned a disguise, traveled to the tense area and retrieved the bodies of the slain missionaries. Many of the Church members at Cane Creek left in November 1884, emigrating to Colorado. In 1888, another group of 177 Latter-day Saints left Chattanooga for Colorado and Utah.

By the 1890s, public opinion became more tolerant.  The oldest existing meetinghouse in the Southeast was dedicated in Northcutts’ Cove on October 24, 1909, by Charles A. Collis. Ten years later, branches were listed in Chattanooga and Memphis.  On November 16, 1925, a chapel in Memphis was dedicated by Elder George F. Richards of the Quorum of the Twelve.  By 1930, about 2832 members lived in the Middle and East Tennessee Districts.

On April 18, 1965, the Memphis Stake, Tennessee's first, was created by Elder Howard W. Hunter of the Quorum of the Twelve.  On March 15–16, 1997, more than 6500 people attended a meeting where President Gordon B. Hinckley spoke in the Knoxville Civic Coliseum.

Following Hurricane Katrina in 2005, several thousand Latter-day Saint volunteers, from a seven-state area (including Tennessee), went to Louisiana and Mississippi. Many of them took time out of their jobs or came down on the weekends to help anyone needing assistance (Mormon and non-Mormon).

Tennessee "Mormons" volunteered relief in their own area on several occasions including the April 2, 2006 tornado outbreak, and the April 6–8, 2006 tornado outbreak.

In 2007, 360 members of the Mormon Tabernacle Choir and 65 members of the Orchestra at Temple Square performed at the Gaylord Entertainment Center in Nashville (June 30), and at the FedEx Forum in Memphis (July 2).

In September 2008, Latter-day Saints from both of the Memphis stakes went to the Baton Rouge area to aid cleanup efforts following Hurricane Gustav.

Stakes

As of February 2023, there were 12 stakes with their stake center located in Tennessee.

Stakes with congregations in Tennessee are as follows:

Missions
The Southern States Mission was formally organized in 1875 with its headquarters in Nashville. In 1882, the headquarters moved to Chattanooga, until in 1919, it moved to Atlanta, Georgia. Tennessee remained in the Southern States Mission until the creation of the East Central States Mission in 1928. In 1975, the Tennessee Nashville Mission was organized. In 1993, the Tennessee Knoxville was organized from the Tennessee Nashville Mission.

Temples

On November 12, 1994, a letter sent to priesthood leaders announced plans to build a temple in Nashville.  However, after three unsuccessful years of trying to gain approvals, Church leaders announced on April 25, 1998, they would move ahead with plans to build a temple somewhere else in the Nashville area, and said the temple would be substantially smaller in size.  That fall, on September 17, 1998, the first presidency announced it would build a second temple in Tennessee, this one in Memphis.  The temple in the suburb of Bartlett was dedicated on April 23, 2000.  The Next month, on May 21, 2000, the Nashville Tennessee Temple, in the suburb of Franklin, was dedicated.

On April 3, 2022, President Nelson announced plans to build a temple in the Knoxville area. The exact location has not yet been announced.

Prominent members connected with Tennessee
D. Todd Christofferson, called to the Quorum of the Twelve Apostles on April 5, 2008, was senior vice president and general counsel for Commerce Union Bank of Tennessee in Nashville. He was also active in community affairs and interfaith organizations.  He was the chair of the Middle Tennessee Literacy Coalition and the chair of Affordable Housing of Nashville.

See also

 The Church of Jesus Christ of Latter-day Saints membership statistics (United States)

References

External links
 Newsroom (Tennessee)
 ComeUntoChrist.org Latter-day Saints visitor site
 The Church of Jesus Christ of Latter-day Saints official site

Latter Day Saint movement in Tennessee
Tennessee